Diego Rangel Vega (born 21 January 1997) is a Mexican footballer who plays as a defender for Sport Boys on loan from Monarcas Morelia.

References

External links
 
 
 
 

1997 births
Living people
Footballers from Michoacán
Sportspeople from Morelia
Association football defenders
Mexican footballers
Atlético Morelia players